Teleamazonas is an Ecuadorian television network that was launched on 22 February 1974. It is one of the major television networks in the country. It was founded by Antonio Granda Centeno and has two feeds: one produced in Quito and broadcast in the rest of the country, and the other one produced in and distributed in Guayaquil.

History 
Teleamazonas began broadcasting on February 22, 1974, as the first network with colour television transmissions in Ecuador. Its headquarters and main studios are located in Quito. Teleamazonas got the most powerful microwave radio relay, acquired the first mobile television unit, and built in Guayaquil the biggest self-supported antenna. From the start, it was the first ever color TV station in Spanish-speaking Latin America, a move that would inspire its neighboring countries to make the switch to color TV.

In addition, the network made history as Ecuador's first true national network - while the Quito station had been opened during its first weeks, plans were underway to build a number of transmitter towers to relay programming to the provinces as well as to Guayaquil in the south as well as dedicated studios for regional news bureaus.

Founded by Antonio Granda Centeno, the channel was under control of his family until 2001, when Eduardo Granda Garcés paid a high debt to Banco del Pichincha. Fidel Egas Grijalva, major shareholder of the bank, took charge of Teleamazonas.

During the presidency of Rafael Correa, the network, particularly its flagship opinion maker and pundit Jorge Ortiz, has found itself at odds with the government, which accuses it of manipulating public opinion to suite the interests of the companies and shareholders who provide the capital for Teleamazonas such as the Banco del Pichincha. Several proceedings have taken place against Teleamazonas, culminating on December 23, 2009, when the network was ordered a 72-hour shutdown. This government move immediately prompted a backlash from advocacy groups who claimed to be acting in the interests of freedom of expression.

In September 2010, Fidel Egas sold his shares on Teleamazonas to several groups: 30% to the Peruvian media group La República, 48% to a group of Teleamazonas employees and 22% to a group of Fidel Egas' personal friends. Teleamazonas sale was the result of the mandate of the Ecuadorian Constitution of 2008, which provides that no person may simultaneously hold shares in banks and media. In 2019, Teleamazonas joined forces with Endemol Shine Group to create the first ever Ecuadorian version of MasterChef.

Programming 

Teleamazonas has produced important national series and films like "Sucre", "En un rincón del alma", "Recuerdos en Paita", "El Gran Retorno", "J. J., El Ruiseñor de América", among others. The channel also airs dramas, films as well as anime shows like Doraemon. (both modern and classic versions)

References

External links

Television channels in Ecuador
Television channels and stations established in 1974
Spanish-language television stations